Juan Ignacio Carrasco (born 9 July 1974) is a former professional tennis player from Spain.

Career
Carrasco, a doubles specialist, appeared in 17 Grand Slams during his career. He competed in the men's doubles on each occasion and also played mixed doubles once, at the 2000 Wimbledon Championships with Gisela Riera as his partner. Carrasco and Riera made the third round, which was also the furthest he ever reached in the men's doubles, at the 2000 French Open with Jairo Velasco, Jr. En route, the pair defeated ninth seeds Mahesh Bhupathi and David Prinosil.

It was with Velasco that he made his only ATP Tour final, which was at Marseille in 2000. They also reached semi-finals in Mallorca and Bogota in 1999 and 2000. His other best results were semi-final appearances with Alex Lopez Moron at both Stuttgart and Bucharest in 2002. He also made the semi-finals of the 2003 Dutch Open, partnering Johan Landsberg.

He only played singles tennis on the Challenger circuit and in 1993 reached his highest ever ranking, 342 in the world.

ATP career finals

Doubles: 1 (0–1)

Challenger titles

Doubles: (14)

References

External links
 
 

1974 births
Living people
Spanish male tennis players
Tennis players from Barcelona
Tennis players from Catalonia